Ultra Golf, known in Europe as Konami Golf and in Japan as , is a golf video game developed by Konami for the Game Boy system. It was released by Konami on November 1, 1991 in Japan, later being released in North America in March 1992, and in the PAL region in 1994.

Gameplay
The game features two courses and a tournament mode, in which a player must win on the first course to play tournaments on the second course. It also has a practice mode which allows the player to play both courses regardless of the tournament status.

Reception
The game received generally positive reviews.

See also
Konami's Open Golf Championship
ESPN Final Round Golf 2002

References

External links

1991 video games
Game Boy-only games
Golf video games
Konami games
Game Boy games
Video games developed in Japan